Arzoumanian is an Armenian surname Western Armenian Արզումանեան; In Eastern Armenian Arzumanyan in Armenian: Արզումանյան

Notable people with the surname include:

Ana Arzoumanian (born 1962), Argentine lawyer and writer
Baghdasar Arzoumanian (1916–2001), Armenian architect

See also
Arzumanyan in Eastern Armenian

Armenian-language surnames